This a list of species, genera, and other taxa named after human genitals.

Plants

Families 
 Orchidaceae. The type genus is Orchis, whose name comes from the Ancient Greek , literally meaning "testicle", because of the shape of the twin tubers in some species of Orchis.

Genera 
 Amorphophallus
 Clitoria
 Orchis

Species 
 Alysicarpus vaginalis
 Baumea vaginalis
 Chenopodium vulvaria
 Festuca vaginalis
 Pontederia vaginalis

Varieties 
 Capsicum annum annum var. annum 'penis pepper'

Fungi

Orders 
 Phallales

Families 
 Phallaceae

Genera 
 Phallus

Species 
 Amanita phalloides

Animals

Subspecies 

 Muntiacus muntjak vaginalis

General 
 Pubescens. The word originates from the Latin pubes, "adult, full-grown"; "genital area, groin"  (e.g., Pubis); "the down or soft hair which begins to grow on young persons when they come to the age of puberty". The use of the term in biology to refer to hairiness or soft down is recorded since 1760 for plants and since 1826 for insects.
 Vaginalis. The common specific name is derived from the Latin vagina, originally meaning "sheath, scabbard, covering; sheath of an ear of grain, hull, husk." The specific epithet may refer to a sheathed trait or habit of an organism (e.g. Alysicarpus vaginalis), or may refer to resemblance/relation to the vagina (e.g. Gardnerella vaginalis)

References 

Taxa
Science-related lists
Human reproductive system